The 1993 Grand Prix de Tennis de Toulouse was a men's tennis tournament played on indoor carpet courts in Toulouse, France that was part of the World Series of the 1993 ATP Tour. It was the twelfth edition of the tournament and was held from 4 October until 10 October 1993. Fifth-seeded Arnaud Boetsch won the singles title.

Finals

Singles

 Arnaud Boetsch defeated  Cédric Pioline, 7–6, 3–6, 6–3

Doubles

 Byron Black /  Jonathan Stark defeated  David Prinosil /  Udo Riglewski, 7–5, 7–6

References

External links
 ITF tournament edition details

Grand Prix de Tennis de Toulouse
Grand Prix de Tennis de Toulouse
Grand Prix de Tennis de Toulouse
Grand Prix de Tennis de Toulouse